LeRoy Eltinge (September 17, 1872 – May 13, 1931) was a United States Army officer in the late 19th and early 20th centuries. He served in several wars and conflicts, including the Spanish–American War and World War I, for which he received the Army Distinguished Service Medal and numerous other awards for his role in them.

Biography
Eltinge was born on September 17, 1872, in South Woodstock, New York. he graduated from the United States Military Academy in 1896 and was commissioned into the 4th Cavalry Regiment.

Eltinge served in the Philippines from 1898 to 1899 as part of the Spanish–American War and from 1901 to 1903 as part of the Philippine–American War. He was wounded in the latter conflict and received a Silver Star. Eltinge served in the Second Occupation of Cuba from 1906 to 1907, and he became an honor graduate of the School of the Line in 1908. After graduating from the Army Staff College in 1909, he served as an instructor there until 1912. Eltinge went to the border of Mexico in 1914, and he participated in the Pancho Villa Expedition in 1916.

On July 28, 1917, Eltinge went to France as part of the G-3 Operations Section of the General Staff. After becoming Deputy Chief of Staff on May 1, 1918, he was promoted to the rank of brigadier general on August 1, 1918. Eltinge's assignment ended on June 30, 1919. He received the Army Distinguished Service Medal for his efforts in the war, and he received numerous foreign awards. The citation for his Army DSM reads:

Between 1921 and 1923, Eltinge served as Assistant Chief of Staff of the Philippine Department, and he served as the commanding general of the Operations and Training Division of the U.S. Army from June 2, 1924, to April 19, 1925. Eltinge died in Fort Omaha on May 13, 1931. He is buried at Arlington National Cemetery.

Personal life
Eltinge married Effee B. Trotter on December 3, 1897, and they had one daughter together. He was a Baptist.

Legacy
The , which was launched in 1944, was named after Eltinge.

Awards
(Sources:)
 Army Distinguished Service Medal
 Silver Star
 Legion of Honour (France)
 Croix de Guerre (France)
 Order of the Crown (Belgium)
 Order of the Crown of Italy
 Companion of the Bath (United Kingdom)
 Order of La Solidaridad (Panama)

References

Bibliography

1872 births
1931 deaths
United States Army Cavalry Branch personnel
People from Woodstock, New York
American military personnel of the Spanish–American War
United States Army generals of World War I
United States Army generals
Recipients of the Silver Star
Recipients of the Distinguished Service Medal (US Army)
Commandeurs of the Légion d'honneur
Recipients of the Croix de Guerre 1914–1918 (France)
Commanders of the Order of the Crown (Belgium)
Recipients of Italian civil awards and decorations
Honorary Companions of the Order of the Bath
United States Military Academy alumni
United States Army Command and General Staff College alumni
Burials at Arlington National Cemetery
Military personnel from New York (state)